Arantxa Urretabizkaia Bejarano (born July 1, 1947), is a contemporary Basque writer, screenwriter and actress. She was born in Donostia-San Sebastián, Guipúzcoa, País Vasco.

Biography 
As a student at the University of Barcelona, Urretabizkaia wrote the screenplays of:
 A los cuatro vientos, (English title: To the Four Winds), 1987
 Zergatik panpox? (Basque - released as a film in 1985)
 Albaniaren konkista, (Basque title: Albaniaren konkista), 1984.

In 1981 she also acted in La Fuga de Segovia film (English title: Escape from Segovia).

The Basque theatre company Agerre Teatroa adapted her novel «Zergatik Panpox?»  and performed in Madrid the resulting monologue, an interpretation by Maite Agirre of the feminine condition and fin de siècle solitude.

In 1988, the Basque Government's Department of Culture and Tourism created the Premio de Merecimiento de las Letras Vascas and appointed Urretabizkaia a member to represent Basque cultural interests.

Some of her works have also been translated to German.

Works

Short stories 
 Aspaldian espero zaitudalako ez nago sekula bakarrik (1983, Erein)
 Aurten aldatuko da nire bizitza (1992, Erein)

Novels 
 Zergatik panpox? (1979, Hordago) . Spanish: ¿Por qué Panpox?, Edicions del Mall, 
 Saturno (1987, Erein). Spanish: Alfaguara hispánica, 1999
 Koaderno gorria (1998, Erein)

Poetry 
 Maitasunaren magalean (1982, GAK)
 XX. mendeko poesia kaierak - Arantxa Urretabizkaia (2000, Susa)

References 

1947 births
Living people
Basque women writers
Actresses from the Basque Country (autonomous community)
Translators from Spanish
Translators to Basque
Basque-language writers
People from San Sebastián
University of Barcelona alumni
Basque novelists
Basque-language poets
Spanish women poets
Spanish women short story writers
Spanish short story writers
20th-century Spanish poets
20th-century Spanish novelists
20th-century Spanish women writers
Spanish women novelists
Spanish translators
20th-century translators
Spanish film actresses
20th-century short story writers
Basque translators